Kyotorphin (L-tyrosyl-L-arginine) is a neuroactive dipeptide which plays a role in pain regulation in the brain. It was first isolated from bovine brain, by Japanese scientists in 1979. Kyotorphin was named for the site of its discovery, Kyoto, Japan and because of its morphine- (or endorphin-) like analgesic activity. Kyotorphin has an analgesic effect, but it does not interact with the opioid receptors. Instead, it acts by releasing met-enkephalin and stabilizing it from degradation. It may also possess properties of neuromediator/neuromodulator. It has been shown that kyotorphin is present in the human cerebrospinal fluid and that its concentration is lower in patients with persistent pain.

References

Dipeptides